The Afghan Ministry of Economy was the Afghan Government Ministry in charge of stimulating the Economy of the country. The current Minister of Economy is Din Mohammad Hanif.

Ministers

External links
 Official Website Ministry of Economy
Abdul Sattar Murad 2015–Present

References

Economy
Afghanistan